The 1937–38 Arkansas Razorbacks men's basketball team represented the University of Arkansas in the 1937-38 college basketball season. The Razorbacks played their home games in the new Men's Gymnasium, after fourteen seasons in Schmidt Gymnasium. It was Glen Rose's fifth season as head coach of the Hogs. Arkansas won the Southwest Conference Championship for the eighth time in the program's fifteenth season, finishing with an 11-1 record in conference play and 19-3 overall.

Roster

There are two unknown players named Haygood that played for the 1937-38 team.

Schedule and Results
Schedule retrieved from HogStats.com.

References

Arkansas Razorbacks
Arkansas Razorbacks men's basketball seasons